Pain is a monthly peer-reviewed medical journal published by Lippincott Williams & Wilkins on behalf of the International Association for the Study of Pain. The journal was established in 1975 and covers research and reviews in the fields of anesthesiology and clinical neurology. The editor-in-chief is Francis J. Keefe (Duke University).

Abstracting and indexing 
The journal is abstracted and indexed in:

According to the Journal Citation Reports, the journal has a 2018 impact factor of 6.029.

References

External links 
 

Anesthesiology and palliative medicine journals
Monthly journals
English-language journals
Publications established in 1975
Lippincott Williams & Wilkins academic journals
Academic journals associated with learned and professional societies